The Spring Lake Bridge is a historic bridge in the eastern part of Ozark-St. Francis National Forest, carrying County Road 35 across an inlet of Spring Lake known as Bob Barnes Branch, in the Spring Lake Recreation Area with the Ozark–St. Francis National Forest. Built in 1936 with federal funding, it is one of the state's finest examples of a stone arch bridge.

The bridge was listed on the National Register of Historic Places in 1990.

See also
List of bridges documented by the Historic American Engineering Record in Arkansas
List of bridges on the National Register of Historic Places in Arkansas
National Register of Historic Places listings in Yell County, Arkansas

References

External links

Road bridges on the National Register of Historic Places in Arkansas
Historic American Engineering Record in Arkansas
National Register of Historic Places in Yell County, Arkansas
Bridges completed in 1936
Individually listed contributing properties to historic districts on the National Register in Arkansas
Civilian Conservation Corps in Arkansas
Stone arch bridges in the United States
1936 establishments in Arkansas
Transportation in Yell County, Arkansas
Ozark–St. Francis National Forest